Springdale Historic District is a national historic district located in the Springdale neighborhood of York in York County, Pennsylvania.  It is south of the York Historic District.   The district includes 199 contributing buildings and 1 contributing site in a residential area of York. The neighborhood was developed between 1920 and 1950, and includes notable examples of the Colonial Revival and Classical Revival styles.

It was listed on the National Register of Historic Places in 2001.

References 

York, Pennsylvania
Historic districts on the National Register of Historic Places in Pennsylvania
Colonial Revival architecture in Pennsylvania
Neoclassical architecture in Pennsylvania
Historic districts in York County, Pennsylvania
National Register of Historic Places in York County, Pennsylvania